The Annals of Ghent is a short Medieval chronicle which is an important source on the history of the County of Flanders and, in particular, for the Franco-Flemish War (1297–1305) and Crusade of the Poor (1309). Written by an unknown Franciscan friar and named after the author's native city of Ghent, the text was written in Latin and covers the period between 1297 and 1310. According to the writer's own declaration, work on the chronicle began in 1308. Written by the author at an old age, the preface of the Annals opens:

The original manuscript of the Annals was preserved until the 19th century and was last attested at Hamburg in 1824, although several copies were made during the early modern period. An English translation was published in 1951 by the historian Hilda Johnstone, and reissued in 1985.

See also
Courtrai Chest

References

Bibliography

1308 works
14th century in the county of Flanders
Medieval historical texts
History of Ghent
14th-century Latin books
History books about Belgium